Bicycle commuting is the use of a bicycle to travel from home to a place of work or study — in contrast to the use of a bicycle for sport, recreation or touring.

Commuting especially lends itself to areas with relatively flat terrain and arrangements to keep riders relatively safe from the hazards of accidents with motorized traffic, e.g. separated bicycle lanes and a general acceptance of cyclists as traffic participants. The rise of the electric bicycle which is quickly surpassing the sales of conventional bicycles will effectively increase bicycle commuting in hilly areas and allow for longer journeys.

A bike bus is a form of collective bicycle commuting where participants cycle together on a set route following a set timetable. Cyclists may join or leave the bike bus at various points along the route.

Bicycles are used for commuting worldwide. In some places, like the Netherlands, cycling to work is very common. Elsewhere, commuting by car or public transport is the norm, and cycle commuting occurs only in isolated pockets, as in the United States. Mixed-mode commuting combines the use of a bicycle with public transportation for commuting.

Cycling is an inexpensive means of transportation as well as good physical exercise.  Bicycle commuting offers potential health, economic, and quality of life benefits — potentially offsetting some of the risks and inconveniences inherent in cycling. When compared to driving, cycling's inconveniences include limitations to travel distance, security risks, increased travel time, safety risks, impact to personal hygiene, exposure to inclement weather, and load carrying limitations.

Bicycle features that enhance commuting include racks or panniers for storage, battery or dynamo-powered lights for increased visibility, mudguards or fenders to minimize the impact of inclement weather, a chain guard to protect clothing, and an upright sitting position for increased visibility.  2008 saw the rise of bikes in the U.S with similar features, so-called commuter bikes, which are geared directly at riders looking to use bicycles for daily work and study travel. 
In geographic areas where winter weather creates the likelihood of snow or ice on a bike commuter's route, studded bicycle tires are another feature that can improve the cyclist's safety while commuting, by increasing the tires' traction on slippery road surfaces.

United States
In 2008, the Bicycle Commuter Benefit Act became law as part of the bailout bill.  According to census data, men are the primary beneficiaries, since, a decade later, men overwhelmingly made up the majority of bicycle commuters.

The United States Census collects information from respondents about Means of Transportation to Work. Bicycle has been an option since the 1980 Census. The Census does not collect information about transportation means to school. List of U.S. cities with most bicycle commuters.

The Netherlands

In the Netherlands, commuting by bicycle is common, as is the combined use of the bicycle with public transportation. In their programmes for the parliamentary elections, almost all Dutch political parties add paragraphs in which they vow to enhance facilities for bicycle commuting. The political party GroenLinks even promotes a principle called "Groen Reizen" (green travelling), in which the choice to use bicycles and public transportation plays a key role.

Canada 

Statistics Canada collects information in a national census held every five years that includes data about how Canadians travel to work in Census Metropolitan Areas. Commuting by bicycle has a low overall percent of commuters by bike at 1.4% but commuting by bicycle is the fastest growing method of commuting, increasing by 87.9% from 1996 to 2016, outpacing the overall growth in the number of commuters.

See also

Bicycle-friendly
Bicycle mobility
Bicycle transportation engineering
Bike-to-Work Day
List of U.S. cities with most bicycle commuters
Cycling infrastructure
European city bike
Environmental impact of transport
Segregated cycle facilities
Utility cycling
Bicycle safety
Bicycle parking
Bike bus

References

External links

Bike to Work Week/Day Map and Events List
Commuting 101 commutebybike.com
Commuter Bike Meccas 
8 Best Cities for Cyclists

Commuting